Santa María Department is a  department of Córdoba Province in Argentina.

The provincial subdivision has a population of about 86,083 inhabitants in an area of 3,427 km², and its capital city is Alta Gracia, which is located around 747 km from the Capital federal.

Settlements 
 Alta Gracia
 Anisacate
 Bower
 Despeñaderos
 Dique Chico
 Falda del Carmen
 La Paisanita
 La Rancherita
 La Serranita
 Los Cedros
 Lozada
 Malagueño
 Monte Ralo
 Potrero de Garay
 Rafael García
 San Clemente
 Toledo
 Valle de Anisacate
 Villa Ciudad de América
 Villa del Prado
 Villa La Bolsa
 Villa Los Aromos
 Villa Parque Santa Ana
 Villa San Isidro

Attractions 
The Jesuit Block and Estancias of Córdoba World Heritage Site is located in Alta Gracia.

Departments of Córdoba Province, Argentina